Dingamanik is a village in Naria Upazila of Shariatpur District under Dhaka Division of southern-central Bangladesh.

Geography
The village is situated in the bank of a small river branch of Padma River. It is the eastern border for Naria Upazila.

Religious importance
The village is home to Sri Satyanarayan Seva Mandir, a hermitage established in 1943 to mark the birthplace of the Hindu sage Ram Thakur.

Transportation
Local village roads and the side by river branch is the only route for the transportation. Using waterway pilgrims either travels  to north towards Padma River or travels  to south for Bhedarganj Upazila.

References

Shariatpur District